Shabina Khan is an Indian choreographer. She choreographed songs for the film Prem Ratan Dhan Payo, starring Salman Khan and produced by Rajshri Films, recently she choreographed songs for the film Tubelight starring Salman Khan.

Career timeline

1996: She started assisting the choreographer Ganesh Hegde for the film Khamoshi: The Musical.

1996 - 2001 : She assisted Ganesh Acharya. During this phase she started receiving offers to choreograph independently.

1998 : She assisted Saroj Khan for the film Soldier (1998 Indian film).

2002 : She assisted Prabhudeva for a year.

2003 : Independent choreographer for the film Main Madhuri Dixit Banna Chahti Hoon produced by the ace producer/director Ram Gopal Verma
2021 : She launched 'Reality in Reality', a reality show an initiative through which she wants to provide a platform to dancers to show off their skills.

Filmography

References

 
 
 

Indian film choreographers
Living people
Indian women choreographers
Indian choreographers
Dancers from Maharashtra
Women artists from Maharashtra
Artists from Mumbai
1980 births